The men's 60 metres was the shortest of the track races at the 1900 Summer Olympics in Paris, which was the first time the event was held. It was held on 15 July 1900. 10 athletes from 6 nations competed. Five preliminary heats were scheduled, though only two were actually held. The top two athletes from each of the heats advanced to the final, resulting in a final race that featured three United States runners and an Australian. Hurdle specialist Alvin Kraenzlein of the United States won the event, with his countryman Walter Tewksbury in second and Australian Stan Rowley earning bronze.

Background

This was the first time the event was held; it would be held again only in 1904 before being discontinued. 110 metres hurdles champion Alvin Kraenzlein, 200 metres and 400 metres hurdles champion Walter Tewksbury, and 100 metres and 200 metres bronze medalist Stan Rowley were among the entrants.

Australia, France, Hungary, India, Sweden, and the United States competed in the debut of the event.

Records

World bests were not recognized until 1966.

As this was a new event, there was no standing Olympic record: Alvin Kraenzlein set the initial record with 7.0 seconds in the first semifinal, then equalled it in the final.

Competition format

The competition consisted of two rounds: semifinals and a final. The top two runners in each of the two semifinals advanced to the final.

Schedule

Results

Semifinals

Semifinal 1

Minahan was about half a yard behind Kraenzlein, with Pritchard a yard behind him.

Semifinal 2

Tewksbury beat Rowley by a foot.

Final

The 60 metres final was a close race, with the two top Americans being separated by four inches and Rowley half a yard behind. It was each of the runners' second time running the 60 in less than an hour, as the final was held almost immediately after the preliminary heats.

Sources

 International Olympic Committee.
 De Wael, Herman. Herman's Full Olympians: "Athletics 1900". Accessed 18 March 2006.
 

Men's 0060 metres
1900